Dear Dad is a 2016 drama film written and directed by Tanuj Bhramar. The film narrates the tale of a father-son duo – 14 year old Shivam (Himanshu Sharma), and his 45 year old dad Nitin (Arvind Swamy). The film released on 13 May 2016. This is the third Hindi film that Arvind Swamy has acted in.

Cast
 Arvind Swamy as Nitin Swaminathan
 Himanshu Sharma as Shivam Swaminathan
 Ekavali Khanna as Nupur Swaminathan
 Indu Ramchandani as Nitin's Mom
 Ranjith Thakur as Nitin's Father
 Sonika Chopra as Principal Sonika
 Aman Uppal as Aditya Taneja
 Shivam Pradhan as Baba Kaam Bengali
 Bhavika Bhasin as Vidhi Swaminathan
 Raman Singh Rawat as Guide
 Chinmai Chandranshuh as Arun
 Ravneet Kler as Ayush Deewan
 Yugdeep as Shivam's friend 
 Abhijeet as Shivam's friend 
 Nishant as Shivam's friend 
 Piyush Raina as Receptionist 
 Kanak as Natasha
 B Akshay as Shubh Sharma
 Aditya Suresh as Young Shivam Swaminathan 
 Sidharth Bansal as Young Shivam Swaminathan

Release 
The Times of India gave the film a rating of three out of five stars and stated that "Dear Dad deserves a watch simply for the profound point it makes about accepting people for who they are and loving them unconditionally". The Hindustan Times gave the film a rating of three-and-a-half out of five stars and wrote that "Luckily, “Dear Dad” is strong enough to withstand extraneous attacks. It is a strong subject and a potentially powerful film replete with the tenderness and brutality that those whom we love tend to thrust on us when pushed to the wall". The Hindu wrote that "So once the disclosure is over and done with there’s nothing else to keep you hooked, Arvind Swamy’s pleasing presence and earnest effort notwithstanding".

References

External links

2016 films
2010s Hindi-language films
2016 comedy-drama films
Indian comedy-drama films
Films about dysfunctional families
Films shot in Delhi
Films set in Delhi
Films shot in Uttarakhand
Films set in Dehradun
Indian LGBT-related films
2016 comedy films